Celeina Ann (born March 7, 1996) is a Japanese singer-songwriter.

Early life

Celeina Ann was born in Tokyo, Japan to a Japanese father and an American mother.

Career

Celeina Ann debuted with her first mini album, We Are One, on November 27, 2015, on iTunes, which later received a physical release on April 20, 2016. The mini album charted at No. 4 on iTunes. In 2018, Celeina Ann contributed the songs "La La Bye", "Silver Winter Love", and "Love Yourself" to the album Quality, with other Starbase Records artists. In 2019, Celeina Ann collaborated with DJ Okawari to produce the album Nightfall.

Discography

Studio albums

Extended plays

Singles

Filmography

Radio

Anime

References

External links
 

1996 births
21st-century Japanese women singers
21st-century Japanese singers
English-language singers from Japan
Japanese women pop singers
Japanese people of American descent
Living people
Singers from Tokyo